Nepharinus goudiei is a species of beetle in the family Silvanidae, the only species in the genus Nepharinus.

References

Silvanidae